Sándor Török (14 February 1881 – 13 February 1939) was a Hungarian sports shooter. He competed at the 1906 Intercalated Games and the 1912 Summer Olympics.

References

1881 births
1939 deaths
Hungarian male sport shooters
Olympic shooters of Hungary
Shooters at the 1906 Intercalated Games
Shooters at the 1912 Summer Olympics
Sportspeople from Vienna